"Egg Shaped Fred" (lead track of One EP) is a song by the English alternative rock band Mansun. The song was written by band-leader Paul Draper. It was produced by Draper, mixing and engineering by Ronnie Stone with assistance from the group's long-term collaborator Mike Hunter. Released in 1996 the song was the group's major label début for Parlophone and their third release overall. It was released as One EP, using the band's own numbering system. The EP was their first to enter the UK Top 40 peaking at #37."Egg Shaped Fred" was remixed and extended for inclusion on Mansun's debut album Attack of the Grey Lantern in 1997.

The promotional music video for "Egg Shaped Fred" was directed by Lawrence Watson.

Track listing

Personnel

Mansun
 Dominic Chad - Lead Guitar
 Paul Draper - Vocals, Guitar
 Hib - Drums
 Stove - Bass

Production
 Paul Draper - producer
 Ronnie Stone - engineering, mixing
 Mike Hunter - engineering assistant, mixing assistant
 Mansun - Sleeve
 Vegas - Sleeve

Chart positions

References

1996 singles
Mansun songs
Songs written by Paul Draper (musician)